Panasonic Lumix DMC-TZ20 is a digital camera by Panasonic Lumix. The highest-resolution pictures it records is 14.1 megapixels, through its 24mm Ultra Wide-Angle Leica DC VARIO-ELMAR.

Property
24 mm LEICA DC
16x optical zoom
Full HD movies 1.920 x 1.080 50i
GPS integrated
touch-screen LCD
3D photos
iA (Intelligent Auto) mode with night shot free-hand

References

External links

DMC-TZ20 on panasonic.it
Panasonic Lumix DMC-TZ20 review

Point-and-shoot cameras
TZ20